The AeroTwin AT972T is an American aircraft engine, designed and produced by the AeroTwin Motors Corporation, a subsidiary of the AirScooter Corporation of Henderson, Nevada for use in ultralight aircraft, in particular their AirScooter helicopter design.

The company seems to have been founded about 2002 and gone out of business in 2012 and production ended.

Design and development
The engine is a twin-cylinder four-stroke, in-line,  displacement, air and oil-cooled, gasoline engine design, with either a poly V belt or mechanical gearbox reduction drive with a clutch and reduction ratios of 1.88, 2.00 and 2.14:1. It employs dual electronic ignition and produces  at 4200 rpm, with a compression ratio of 8.0:1.

Specifications (AT972T)

See also

References

External links
Official website archives on Archive.org

AeroTwin aircraft engines
Air-cooled aircraft piston engines
2000s aircraft piston engines